Pomerelle Mountain is an alpine ski area in the western United States, in south central Idaho.

There are two chairlifts (both triple) and a magic carpet for the beginners' area.

One of the oldest ski areas in the western U.S., Pomerelle began its operations  in 1940. During the ski season, it operates daily and five nights per week (Tuesday through Saturday).

Pomerelle features a spacious lodge at the bottom of the mountain offering foods and beverages. There is also a grill outside the lodge on the deck that offers hamburgers, hot dogs, cold drinks, and beer. In the basement of the lodge, there is a rental shop.

On New Year's Day in 1973, a chairlift mishap injured 21 skiers; fortunately there were no fatalities.

References

External links
 
 Photos of Pomerelle's lifts at SkiLifts.org
 Pomerelle Mountain at IdahoSkiResorts.com
 Visit Idaho.org – Pomerelle
 Ski Map.org – trail maps – Pomerelle
 Pomerelle Mountain at OnTheSnow.com
 Pomerelle at SkiTown.com
 Photos of Cache Peak - 10,339' at IdahoSummits.com

Ski areas and resorts in Idaho
Buildings and structures in Cassia County, Idaho
Tourist attractions in Cassia County, Idaho